Alan S. Goldman is an American chemist and Distinguished Professor of Chemistry at Rutgers University. He is a winner of the ACS Catalysis Lectureship for the Advancement of Catalytic Science, and received the ACS Award in Organometallic Chemistry in 2019 and the Sir Geoffrey Wilkinson Award from the Royal Society of Chemistry (UK) in 2020. In 2021 he was elected as a Fellow of the American Association for the Advancement of Science. Goldman's research has focused on reactions of small molecules catalyzed by transition metal complexes, and the mechanisms of relevant reactions.

References

Living people
Rutgers University faculty
21st-century American chemists
Year of birth missing (living people)